The High Commissioner of Malaysia to the Independent State of Papua New Guinea is the head of Malaysia's diplomatic mission to Papua New Guinea. The position has the rank and status of an Ambassador Extraordinary and Plenipotentiary and is based in the High Commission of Malaysia, Port Moresby.

List of heads of mission

High Commissioners to Papua New Guinea

See also
 Malaysia–Papua New Guinea relations

References 

 
Papua New Guinea
Malaysia